Federal Medical Centre, Umuahia is a federal government of Nigeria medical centre located in Umuahia, Abia State, Nigeria. The current chief medical director is Azubuike Onyebuchi.


History 
Federal Medical Centre, Umuahia was established in 1945. The hospital was formerly known as Queen Elizabeth Specialist Hospital, Umuahia and was renamed to Federal Medical Centre, Umuahia in November 1991.

References 

Hospitals in Nigeria